Rivergrove is a census-designated place (CDP) in Kern County, California. Although it is designated by the census as its own place, it is functionally a neighborhood of Bakersfield.

Geography 
Rivergrove borders Goodmanville to the south and east across the Kern River.

Demographics 
The CDP was first listed in the 2020 census, at which it had 195 people in 74 households.

References 

Census-designated places in Kern County, California